Yelenskaya is a rural locality (a village) in Beketovskoye Rural Settlement, Vozhegodsky District, Vologda Oblast, Russia. The population was 2 as of 2002.

Geography 
The distance to Vozhega is 65 km, to Beketovskaya is 10 km. Rakishevo, Mitrofanovo, Syrnevo, Vrazhnaya, Konechnaya, Pankovo are the nearest rural localities.

References 

Rural localities in Vozhegodsky District